ATBP.: Awit, Titik at Bilang na Pambata is a Philippine children's television program that was aired on ABS-CBN from June 5, 1994 to March 29, 1998.

Cast
Isay Álvarez as Ate Remy
Raúl Arellano as Mang Bertíng
Dois Riego de Dios as Mang Arman
Zeus Inocencio as Mang Pol
Amiel Leonardia as Mang Lino
Lorna López as Bb. Carunungan [Ms. Carunungan]
Jake Macapagal as Dr. Millares
Charmaine Nueros as Aling Becky
PJ Pascual as Miguel
Janice Pronstroller as Mrs. Millares
Ama Quiambao as Aling Tinay
Archie Díaz as Mang Erníng
Grace Ann Bodegón as Ate Nila

The kids
Patricia Anne Roque (later Trish Roque)
Karina Mae "Kara" Cruz
Rex Agoncillo
Charlotte Lugo
Karl Angelo Legaspi
Sheila Lynn Diamse
Peter Fernández
Kristine Patelo
Richard Legarda
Caling Vélez
Aba Chiongson
Paulo Miguel Rebong
Tanya Paula Iwakawa
Karla Mae Silvestre
Chris Emerson Lubi
Marc Anthony Martínez

The puppets
Pipo (a dog)
Tingtíng (a cat)
Kapitán Bilang (“Captain Number”)
Donya Kilatis (“Doña Investigate”, a teacher)
Ook Band (a band of frogs)
Smokey and the Boondocks (a band)
Bebong (a rubbish monster based on Oscar the Grouch of Sesame Street

Animated characters
Pito (a humanoid sketch)
Mr. Sulat (“Mr Write”, a pencil)
Maestro (a painter)

Running gangs and songs

Opening Billboard 
In the show's first year, the opening animated sequence begins with a seven-note tune before the egg hatches into a bird on the tree where the kids playing hide-and-seek before the theme song plays, the kids running with the cat and the dog to see the castle made of building blocks seeing the show title. Animated characters Pito, Mr. Sulat and Maestro are also appearing in the first OBB; the theme song ended with the line "Awit, titik, bilang at iba pa" two times before the chant "At iba pa!" to reveal the show title which is like the song liners in music sheets. Later in 1995 coinciding the reformat of the show, the theme song was later orchestrated with an newer animated OBB sequence featuring the animated versions of its puppets, Pipo, Tingting, Bebong, Kapitan Bilang, Donya Kilatis and Smokey and the Boondocks. Animated characters Pito, Mr. Sulat and Maestro from the first OBB returned for the new billboard. The billboard ends with the line "Awit, titik, bilang at iba pa" two times (from the first OBB); but with adding an newer line "Awit, Titik, Bilang...." before the chant "At iba pa!" and an CGI blocks to reveal the show title.

Letter of the Day 
Following the playing of "Alphabetong Filipino" song, they tell the letter featured on the program (Example: Letter A); some episodes may also appearing with puppets like Donya Kilatis or animated characters like Mr. Sulat wanted to write the letter featured.

Alphabetong Filipino 
The Letter of the Day portion had preceded on the show with the singing of the song Alphabetong Filipino; which is sang by the puppets or cast members, sometimes, celebrity guests may also appeared in singing the song on some occasional episodes.

Number of the Day 
The show also including the Number of the Day portion of which what number is featured (Example: Number 8); some episodes may include the Number of the Day in the "Kaptian Bilang" segments; as well as the singing the featured number performed by the puppet band Ook Band. The segments where preceded on the show with singing of the "Awit ng Bilang".

Awit ng Bilang 
The Number segment appears with the singing of the "Awit ng Bilang" performed by the kids, the puppets, cast members or celebrity guests. There are two different lines in the song; Numbers 1-10 includes the line "Bililang ba Ninyo, Sige na, Ulit-Ulitin Nyo!" (lit. "Do You Remember, Come on, Repeat Again!") and Numbers 1-15 or 1-20 may included the line "Magbilang mula sa umpisa, Sige na, Ulit-Ulitin Pa!" (lit. "Count from the beginning, Go on, Repeat Again!").

Smokey and the Boondocks 
Smokey and the Boondocks, the fictional puppet pop music group of the show, sings their different topics related to every episode. Most songs appears with voiceover opening line "(song name) aawitin sa inyo ng Smokey and the Boondocks!" (lit. "(song name) proudly perform by Smokey and the Boondocks!").

Broadcast
The show was aired on weekdays from 1994 onwards. But in 1997, it was moved to Sunday morning. It also expanded to 1 hour with its reformat as a weekly children's program.  It was re aired many times aired on Az2 11.

Accolades

See also
List of programs aired by ABS-CBN
Batibot

References

Philippine children's television series                                  
Philippine television shows featuring puppetry 
1994 Philippine television series debuts
1998 Philippine television series endings
ABS-CBN original programming
Filipino-language television shows